Andrea Rogers is a former association football player who represented New Zealand at international level.

Rogers spent her early years playing in Hamilton New Zealand with Western United and Claudelands Rovers before moving to England where she played for Arsenal L.F.C. until retiring in 2003. She returned to playing on her return to New Zealand, playing for Claudelands Rovers.

She came out of retirement in 2005 to join an 'oldies' team at Rovers, then returned to their Northern League side for a few years. After two seasons with Hillcrest United (in a specially formed 'oldies' team) Rogers joined Waikato club Cambridge FC in 2014, winning the club's Coaches' Player of the Year and Player's Player of the Year (jointly with Jen Hull) awards in her first season,. In 2017, Rogers was named Cambridge FC's women's Player of the Year.

Rogers made her Football Ferns début in a 0–1 loss to Bulgaria on 24 August 1994, and finished her international career with 13 caps to her credit.

References

Year of birth missing (living people)
Living people
New Zealand women's international footballers
New Zealand women's association footballers
Women's association footballers not categorized by position